This article details the Leeds Rhinos rugby league football club's 2015 season. This was the Rhinos 20th season in the Super League. Leeds Rhinos were reigning Challenge Cup winners and became only the third team in the Super League era to win the treble, winning the Challenge Cup, Super League Leaders' Shield and the 2015 Super League Grand Final.

Players

Squad

 Appearances and points include (Super League, Challenge Cup and Play-offs) as of 10 October 2015.

Transfers

In

Out

Competitions

Super League

Table

Results

Super 8s

Playoffs

Challenge Cup

Club vs. Country

As part of their 2015 tour of Great Britain the New Zealand national rugby league team played a match against Leeds, winning 34 - 16. The match was the first time Leeds had played the Kiwis since 1992. The match celebrated the 125th anniversary of Headingley Stadium. Prior to the match, Leeds had defeated New Zealand once in eleven matches between the two teams.

References

External links
Leeds Rhinos Website
Leeds Rhinos - SL Website

Leeds Rhinos seasons
Leeds Rhinos season
Rugby